The Fenniarail Class Dr18 locomotive is a diesel-electric locomotive used by Fenniarail Oy in freight transport in Finland.

The locomotive is a Finnish variant of the CZ Loko Class 774.7, which in turn is a modernised version of older Czech locomotives (T669). They have been converted from standard to broad gauge, which was possible since the model was prepared for usage in the Soviet Union.

References

External links
 
 Fenniarail: Rolling stock—Dr18 locomotives (official)
 Fenniarail News (official)
 "First private operator in Finland has signed a contract for the delivery of CZ LOKO locomotives" (czloko.com, 2016-12-05)
 "CZ LOKO Delivers 2 More Locomotives to Fennia Rail" (czloko.com, 2017-11-10)

Diesel-electric locomotives of Finland
Railway locomotives introduced in 2015
5 ft gauge locomotives